Alagöz or Alagoz may refer to:

 Alagoz, Iran, in Kurdistan Province, Iran
 Alagöz, Ardahan, a village in the district of Ardahan, Ardahan Province, Turkey
 Alagöz, Hınıs
 Alagöz, Horasan
 Alagöz, Mardin, an Assyrian/Syriac village in Mardin Province, Turkey
 Alagöz, Sandıklı, a village in the district of Sandıklı, Afyonkarahisar Province, Turkey